Helen J. Neville (May 20, 1946 – October 12, 2018) was a Canadian psychologist and neuroscientist known internationally for her research in the field of human brain development.

Personal life and education 
Neville received a B.A. from the University of British Columbia, an M.A. from Simon Fraser University, and a Ph.D. from Cornell University, and she also completed a postdoctoral fellowship in neuroscience at the University of California, San Diego.  She has been employed as Director of the Laboratory for Neuropsychology at the Salk Institute and as a professor in the Department of Cognitive Science at UCSD before joining the faculty at the University of Oregon in 1995, where she remained.

Neville was the Robert and Beverly Lewis Endowed Chair and Professor of Psychology and Neuroscience, Director of the Brain Development Lab, and Director of the Center for Cognitive Neuroscience at the University of Oregon.

Neville died on October 12, 2018 at the age of 72.

Research and publications
Neville studied in cerebral specialization, neuroplasticity of the brain in childhood and adulthood, the roles of biological constraints and experience, and neurolinguistics. In order to investigate these topics, Neville used a variety of methods, including behavioral measures, event-related potentials (ERPs), and structural and functional magnetic resonance imaging (fMRI). Neville's research has helped to distinguish between the brain systems and functions that are largely fixed from those which are modifiable by experience, and with all her work she aimed to make a positive, tangible difference in society. She was involved in a number of outreach programs and charities in addition to scientific research.

Neville has been published extensively, in journals including Nature, Nature Neuroscience, Journal of Neuroscience, Journal of Cognitive Neuroscience, Cerebral Cortex and Brain Research.

Recent topics of research she has been involved in include the neural mechanisms of grammar acquisition in adults, attentional control mechanisms as they relate to working memory, as well as various types of attention and learning mechanisms in young children.

Neville and the Brain Development Lab were also responsible for creating "Changing Brains", a program of video segments aimed at non-scientists to describe what research has revealed the effects of experience on human brain development. The series aims to inform parents, teachers and policymakers on how to help children develop to their full potential. Neurologist Oliver Sacks said the program was "...fascinating and very original in form and presentation — and exactly the way to present (brain) science to non-scientists."

She is the author of the book Temperament tools: working with your child's inborn traits (1998)

Honors and awards
Neville has won grants from the U.S. Department of Education and National Institutes of Health for her work in neurocognitive development. She is a member of the American Academy of Arts and Sciences and a fellow of the American Psychological Society and Society of Experimental Psychologists. In 2013, she received the William James Fellow Award from the Association for Psychological Science. Other awards that she received for her work in psychology are listed below:

References

External links
 Faculty Bio: University of Oregon Department of Neuroscience
 Brain Development Lab
 Training Young Brains to Behave - NYTimes

1946 births
2018 deaths
20th-century American psychologists
American women psychologists
American women neuroscientists
Canadian cognitive neuroscientists
Women cognitive scientists
Psycholinguists
Fellows of the Society of Experimental Psychologists
Fellows of the American Academy of Arts and Sciences
Foreign associates of the National Academy of Sciences
University of Oregon faculty
University of British Columbia alumni
Simon Fraser University alumni
Cornell University alumni
Fellows of the Cognitive Science Society
People from Unity, Saskatchewan
American women academics
21st-century American women scientists